The UK Albums Chart is one of many music charts compiled by the Official Charts Company that calculates the best-selling albums of the week in the United Kingdom. Before 2004, the chart was only based on the sales of physical albums. This list shows albums that peaked in the Top 10 of the UK Albums Chart during 1997, as well as albums which peaked in 1996 and 1998 but were in the top 10 in 1997. The entry date is when the album appeared in the top ten for the first time (week ending, as published by the Official Charts Company, which is six days after the chart is announced).

The first new number-one album of the year was Evita: The Complete Motion Picture Music Soundtrack by Madonna and Various artists. Overall, twenty different albums peaked at number-one in 1997, with twenty unique artists hitting that position.

Background

Best-selling albums
Oasis had the best-selling album of the year with Be Here Now. Urban Hymns by The Verve came in second place Spice by the Spice Girls, Spiceworld by the Spice Girls and White on Blonde by Texas made up the top five. Albums by The Prodigy, Celine Dion, Radiohead, Eternal and Wham! were also in the top-ten best selling albums of the year.

Top-ten albums
Key

See also
1997 in British music
List of number-one albums from the 1990s (UK)

References
General

Specific

External links
1997 album chart archive at the Official Charts Company (click on relevant week)

United Kingdom top 10 albums
Top 10 albums
1997